The Camellia Bowl is an annual National Collegiate Athletic Association (NCAA) sanctioned FBS college football bowl game played in Montgomery, Alabama, at the Cramton Bowl. The game features teams from the Sun Belt Conference and the Mid-American Conference (MAC). The bowl game was announced in August 2013 and first played in December 2014.  The game is owned and managed by ESPN Events and is named after the camellia, which is the state flower of Alabama.

Sponsorship
The bowl was sponsored at its inception by Raycom Media, a major owner of television stations in the southeastern United States with heavy involvement in college sports broadcasting, and was officially known as the Raycom Media Camellia Bowl. In June 2018, Gray Television announced its intent to acquire Raycom The acquisition was completed in January 2019, and the 2019 and 2020 editions of the bowl were played without a title sponsor.

On November 24, 2021, TaxAct was named as the new title sponsor of both the Camellia Bowl and the Texas Bowl.

Game results

Source:

MVPs
The bowl's MVP receives the Bart Starr Most Valuable Player Award; Starr was born and raised in Montgomery, where the Camellia Bowl is played.

Source:

Most appearances
Updated through the December 2022 edition (9 games, 18 total appearances).

Teams with multiple appearances

Teams with a single appearance
Won (3): Bowling Green, Georgia State, Middle Tennessee

Lost (7): Ball State, Eastern Michigan, FIU, Marshall, Ohio, South Alabama, Toledo

Appearances by conference
Updated through the December 2022 edition (9 games, 18 total appearances).

Game records

 For all-purpose yardage, the bowl's record book lists Murray's 179 yards (76 receiving, 103 kickoff return) despite Bayless having 180 yards (all receiving).

Source:

Media coverage

Television

Radio

References

External links
 Official site

 
American football in Alabama
College football bowls
Sports in Montgomery, Alabama
Recurring sporting events established in 2014